Frank Morey (July 11, 1840 – September 22, 1890) was a soldier in the Union Army (1861–1865), reaching the rank of colonel; afterward he moved to Louisiana, where he became a planter and sold insurance. He was elected as a U.S. Representative from Louisiana, serving from 1869 to 1876. His election in 1876 was contested, and he lost his seat in June of that year to Democrat William B. Spencer. Afterward, Morey moved to Washington, D.C., where he practiced law.

Biography
Born in Boston, Massachusetts, Morey attended the public schools. At the age of 17, he moved to Illinois.

Civil War
He studied law, but at the onset of the American Civil War he entered the Union Army in 1861 in the Thirty-third Regiment, Illinois Volunteer Infantry, and served until the close of the war.

Postbellum
After the war, Morey settled in Louisiana in 1866. He engaged in cotton planting and the insurance business.

He was elected as a Republican member of the State house of representatives in 1868 and 1869. He was appointed as a commissioner to revise the statutes and codes of the State under Reconstruction, to reflect national constitutional amendments granting freedmen citizenship and the right to vote. He served as commissioner to the Vienna Exposition in 1873.

Morey was also elected in 1868 as a Republican to the Forty-first Congress, winning re-election and serving in the Forty-second and Forty-third congresses. He served from 1869 to 1876.

He presented his credentials as a Member-elect to the Forty-fourth Congress as well, but it was contested by his Democratic opponent, William B. Spencer. Morey's election was overturned by Congress in June 1876, and Spencer took the seat. The Democrats also regained control of the Louisiana state legislature that year, in an election marked by violence as the White League worked to suppress black voting. In 1877 federal troops were withdrawn from the state with the end of Reconstruction.

Morey moved to Washington, D.C., and practiced law. He died there September 22, 1890. He was interred in the Congressional Cemetery.

See also

References
 Retrieved on 2008-02-14

1840 births
1890 deaths
Burials at the Congressional Cemetery
Union Army soldiers
Republican Party members of the Louisiana House of Representatives
Republican Party members of the United States House of Representatives from Louisiana
19th-century American politicians